Saving Private Perez is a 2011 Mexican Western comedy film directed by Beto Gómez. The plot follows a Mexican organized crime leader, who is asked by his mother to rescue his brother, a United States Marine Private fighting in Iraq. The mobster sets up a team of four hand-picked Mexican men for the mission: his best friend, a Native Indigenous tomato farmer; two older veterans and a convicted murderer who is rescued from prison.

Cast
 Miguel Rodarte as Julián Pérez, a powerful Mexican drug kingpin and Juan Perez's older brother.
 Jesús Ochoa as José María 'Chema' Díaz, one of the two old veterans in the Juan Perez's rescue team.
 Joaquín Cosio as Rosalío 'Chalío' Mendoza, one of the two old veterans in the Juan Perez's rescue team.
 Rodrigo Oviedo as Juventino Rodríguez 'Pumita', a notorious and dangerous convicted murderer, Benito Garcia's sicario and one of the members of Juan Perez's rescue team.
 Gerardo Taracena as Carmelo Benavides, a Native Indigenous tomato farmer, Julian's best friend and one of the members of Juan Perez's rescue team.
 Marius Biegai as Sasha Boginski (Russian: Саша богинский, Sasha Boginskiy), a Russian druggie.
 Jaime Camil as Eladio, Julian's intelligent and wise right-hand.
 Adal Ramones as Benito García, a Mexican drug kingpin and  Julian Perez's archenemy.
 Isela Vega as Doña Elvira de Pérez, the mother of Julian and Juan Perez.
 Juan Carlos Flores as Juan Pérez, a United States Army Private, Julian's younger brother and the main focus of the film.
 Veronica Falcón as Mujer iraquí

References

External links
 
 
 

2011 films
Films scored by Mark Mothersbaugh
2010s Spanish-language films
Films about Mexican drug cartels
2010s Mexican films